The Junior women's race at the 1998 IAAF World Cross Country Championships was held in Marrakech, Morocco, at the Menara district on March 21, 1998.  Reports on the event were given in The New York Times, in the Herald, and for the IAAF.

Complete results for individuals, for teams, medallists, and the results of British athletes were published.

Race results

Junior women's race (6 km)

Individual

Teams

Note: Athletes in parentheses did not score for the team result

Participation
An unofficial count yields the participation of 122 athletes from 35 countries in the Junior women's race.  This is in agreement with the official numbers as published.

 (6)
 (3)
 (1)
 (1)
 (1)
 (3)
 (6)
 (3)
 (6)
 (6)
 (6)
 (6)
 (1)
 (6)
 (6)
 (1)
 (6)
 (1)
 (1)
 (6)
 (1)
 (1)
 (1)
 (1)
 (1)
 (1)
 (5)
 (6)
 (6)
 (4)
 (2)
 (6)
 (6)
 (2)
 (3)

See also
 1998 IAAF World Cross Country Championships – Senior men's race
 1998 IAAF World Cross Country Championships – Men's short race
 1998 IAAF World Cross Country Championships – Junior men's race
 1998 IAAF World Cross Country Championships – Senior women's race
 1998 IAAF World Cross Country Championships – Women's short race

References

Junior women's race at the World Athletics Cross Country Championships
IAAF World Cross Country Championships
1998 in women's athletics
1998 in youth sport